En tierras salvajes (English: Wild Lands) is a 2017 Mexican telenovela produced by Salvador Mejía for Televisa. The series was created by Ramón Campos and Gema R. Neira and stars Claudia Álvarez, Diego Olivera, Cristián de la Fuente, Horacio Pancheri, Ninel Conde, César Évora and Daniela Romo.

Plot summary 
Isabel Montalbán (Claudia Álvarez) is a beautiful woman from the big city, who suffers from a serious lung problem, and goes to live in a small town, in search of rest. In her new residence, live the parents and the brothers of her husband, Aníbal Otero (Diego Olivera).

What no one could imagine is that the young woman's presence would change the fate of the family, forever.

Sergio (Horacio Pancheri) and Daniel (Cristián de la Fuente), are the brothers of Aníbal. Immediately, both feel a strong attraction for the young woman. Sergio is a quiet and sensible man, working as a doctor and always willing to take care of Isabel's health. On the other hand, Daniel is a handsome and savage man; he is the freest of his brothers and lives life with intense passion. He falls madly in love with his sister-in-law, but he knows he must renounce this forbidden love.

On the farm of the Otero family, Don Arturo (César Évora), the patriarch of the family, is a kind and affectionate gentleman, and Doña Amparo (Daniela Romo), his wife, a controlling and arrogant lady.

Isabel's drama begins when she feels that her marriage is failing, since her husband, Aníbal only cares about the family's business and money, and grows more distant from his wife. Isabel realizes that she is falling in love with Daniel and Sergio, but feels that she must fight to save her marriage and avoid a serious conflict in the family.

Cast

Main 
 Claudia Álvarez as Isabel Montalbán
 Diego Olivera as Anibal Otero
 Cristián de la Fuente as Daniel Otero
 Horacio Pancheri as Sergio Otero
 Ninel Conde as Carolina Tinoco
 César Évora as Don Arturo Otero
 Daniela Romo as Dona Amparo Rivelles de Otero

Recurring 
 Nerea Camacho as Alejandra Rivelles Zavala
 Lisardo as Carlos Molina
 Miguel Ángel Biaggio as Fidel Molina
 Jessica Decote as Elisa Molina
 Ximena Córdoba as Olga Guerrero
 Emmanuel Palomares as Uriel Santana
 Jonnathan Kuri as Iker Morales
 Salvador Pineda as Amador Morales
 Lucas Bernabé as Andrés Santana
 Fabián Robles as Víctor Tinoco
 Jackie Sauza as Teresa Castillo
 Martha Julia as Alba Castillo
 David Palacio as Padre Blas
 Luis Xavier as Rodolfo Escamilla
 Daniela Álvarez as Regina
 Claudia Echeverry as Carmen
 Marco Zetina as Gerardo

Production 
Production of the series began on March 13, 2017. It is the first production of Bambú Producciones with Televisa, created by Ramón Campos and Gema R. Neira, writers of the series Velvet and Gran Hotel, and produced by Salvador Mejía. The free version is by Liliana Abud and the adaptation for TV is from Katia Rodríguez and Victoria Orvañanos.

The production began filming in Tzintzuntzan, Michoacán. Much of the production takes place in the Televisa San Ángel forum 10. At the beginning of production, the actors were Salvador Mejía, Cristián de la Fuente, Diego Olivera, Horacio Pancheri, Mayrín Villanueva, Daniela Romo, Maricruz Nájera, César Évora, Ninel Conde, Ximena Córdoba, Emmanuel Palomares, among others. Halfway during filming, Villanueva exited the telenovela. Álvarez replaced her, and part of the filming had to be reshot.

Casting 
On February 22, 2017, producer Salvador Mejía officially presented the cast of the telenovela, where the male protagonists would be de la Fuente, Olivera and Pancheri. Mayrín Villanueva had been chosen as the protagonist of the melodrama, but due to other commitments, she left the project. On February 27, 2017, journalist Martha Figueroa confirmed in the program Hoy that Villanueva will no longer be the one to take the star role, and that it had been assigned to Álvarez. Nerea Camacho was selected as Alejandra.

Rating

Episodes

Awards and nominations

References 

2017 telenovelas
2017 Mexican television series debuts
Mexican telenovelas
2017 Mexican television series endings
Spanish-language telenovelas